The Polish Post Office (Poczta Polska) in the Free City of Danzig (Gdańsk) was created in 1920 and operated until the German invasion of Poland that marked the beginning of World War II.

History
The post was established in Danzig (Gdańsk) under the provisions of the Treaty of Versailles, and its buildings were considered extraterritorial Polish property.

The Polish Post Office in Danzig comprised several buildings, originally built as a German military hospital. In 1930 the "Gdańsk 1" building on Hevelius Platz (square) in the Danziger Altstadt (Old Town) became the primary Polish post office, with a direct telephone line to Poland. In 1939 it employed slightly over 100 people. Some employees at the Polish Post Office belonged to a self-defence and security organization, and many were also members of the Polish Związek Strzelecki (Riflemen's Association). According to the testimony of Edmund Charaszkiewicz, the Polish Post Office was from 1935 an important component of the Polish Intelligence organization, "Group Zygmunt".

As tensions between Poland and Germany grew, in April 1939 the Polish High Command detached combat engineer and Army Reserve Sublieutenant (or 2LT) Konrad Guderski to the Baltic Sea coast. With Alfons Flisykowski and others, he helped organize the official and volunteer security staff at the Polish Post Office in Danzig, and prepare them for eventual hostilities. In addition to training the staff, he prepared the defenses in and around the building: nearby trees were removed and the entrance was fortified. In mid-August, ten additional employees were sent to the post office from Polish Post offices in Gdynia and Bydgoszcz (mostly reserve non-commissioned officers).

In the building of the Polish post on 1 September there were 57 people: Konrad Guderski, 42 local Polish employees, 10 employees from Gdynia and Bydgoszcz, and the building keeper with his wife and 10-year-old daughter who lived in the building. Polish employees had a cache of weapons, including three Browning wz.1928 light machine guns, 40 other firearms and three chests of hand grenades. The Polish defence plan assigned the defenders the role of keeping Germans from the building for 6 hours, when a relief force from Armia Pomorze was supposed to secure the area.

The German attack plan, devised in July 1939, stipulated that the building defenders would be stormed from two directions. A diversionary attack was to be carried out at the front entrance, while the main force would break through the wall from the neighbouring Work Office and attack from the side.

On September 1, 1939,  Polish militiamen defended the building for some 15 hours against assaults by the SS Heimwehr Danzig (SS of the city Danzig), local SA formations, German Ordnungspolizei, and special units of Danzig police. All including four of the defenders who escaped from the building during the surrender were sentenced to death by a German court martial as illegal combatants on October 5, 1939 and executed. For embarrassing german SS unit and his commander director of Danzig post office Jan Michoń was shot dead on place and post master Józef Wąsik was burned alive by flamethrower. Sentence on rest of the defenders has been passed in few days and whole group was executed by the wall by gun fire. 
 
In Poland, the whole episode has become one of the better known episodes of the Polish September Campaign and it is usually portrayed as a heroic story of David and Goliath proportions. In this view, it was a group of postmen who held out against German SS troops for almost an entire day.

Present

After World War II, Danzig was transferred to Poland. Currently, the building is the site of the Polish Post Office in Gdańsk and the Museum of the Polish Post Office in Gdańsk. In front of the Post Office there is the Monument of the Defenders of the Polish Post Office in Gdańsk (unveiled in 1979).

See also
 Defense of the Polish Post Office in Danzig
 Postage stamps and postal history of Free City of Danzig

References

Further reading
 Jank, Janusz. Działalność usługowa poczty polskiej w wolnym mieście Gdańsku w latach 1920-1939 = The Polish postal service in the Free City of Danzig between 1920-1939. Gdansk: Dyrekcja Okręgu Poczty, 1999  143p.

Buildings and structures in Gdańsk
Free City of Danzig
Government buildings completed in 1920
Danzig